Catacombs are man-made subterranean passageways for religious practice. Any chamber used as a burial place is a catacomb, although the word is most commonly associated with the Roman Empire.

Etymology and history
The first place to be referred to as catacombs was the system of underground tombs between the 2nd and 3rd milestones of the Appian Way in Rome, where the bodies of the apostles Peter and Paul, among others, were said to have been buried. The name of that place in Late Latin was L.L. fem. nom. pl. n. catacumbas (sing. catacumba) a word of obscure origin, possibly deriving from a proper name or a derivation of the Latin phrase catatumbas, "among the tombs". The word referred originally only to the Roman catacombs, but was extended by 1836 to refer to any subterranean receptacle of the dead, as in the 18th-century Paris catacombs. The ancient Christians carved the first catacombs from soft tufa rock. (ref)" (World Book Encyclopedia, page 296)

All Roman catacombs were located outside city walls since it was illegal to bury a dead body within the city, providing "a place…where martyrs' tombs could be openly marked" and commemorative services and feasts held safely on sacred days.

Around the world

Catacombs around the world include:

 Austria – Catacombs of St. Stephen's Cathedral, Vienna
 Czech Republic – Catacombs of Znojmo
 Bosnia and Herzegovina – Catacombs of Jajce
 Egypt – Catacombs of Kom el Shoqafa (or Kom al Sukkfa, Shuqafa, etc.) in Alexandria
 England  – Catacombs of London and others
 Finland – Catacombs of the Helsinki Orthodox cemetery at Hietaniemi cemetery
 France – Catacombs of Paris. Mine workings were used at end of the 18th century and had no religious purpose other than as an ossuary for storing the bones of cleared graveyards.
 Greece – Catacombs of Milos
 Italy – Catacombs of Rome; Catacombs of Naples; Capuchin catacombs of Palermo, Catacombs of Syracuse and others
 Malta – Catacombs of Malta
 Peru – Catacombs of Lima
 Philippines - Catacomb of Nagcarlan Underground Cemetery
Spain – Catacombs of Sacromonte in Granada
 Serbia - Petrovaradin Fortress catacombs
 Tunisia - Catacombs of Sousse
 Ukraine – Odessa Catacombs
 United States - Old St. Patrick's Cathedral
There are also catacomb-like burial chambers in Anatolia, Turkey; in Sousse, North Africa; in Syracuse, Italy; Trier, Germany; Kyiv, Ukraine. Capuchin catacombs of Palermo, Sicily were used as late as the 1920s. Catacombs were available in some of the grander English cemeteries founded in the 19th Century, such as Sheffield General Cemetery (above ground) and West Norwood Cemetery (below ground). There are catacombs in Bulgaria near Aladzha Monastery and in Romania as medieval underground galleries in Bucharest. In Ukraine and Russia, catacomb (used in the local languages' plural katakomby) also refers to the network of abandoned caves and tunnels earlier used to mine stone, especially limestone.

Decorations
Catacombs, although most notable as underground passageways and cemeteries, also house many decorations. There are thousands of decorations in the centuries-old catacombs of Rome, catacombs of Paris, and other known, some of which include inscriptions, paintings, statues, ornaments, and other items placed in the graves over the years.

Most of these decorations were used to identify, immortalize and show respect to the dead. Decorations in the catacombs of Rome were primarily decorated with images and words exalting Christ or depicting scenes from the Old and New Testaments of the Bible.
Much of the sculpture work and art, other than engravings on the walls or tombs, has been preserved in places such as the Museum of Saint John Lateran, Christian Museum of Berlin University, and the Vatican.

Three representations of Christ as Orpheus charming animals with peaceful music have been found in the catacombs of Domatilla and St. Callista. Another figure was made of gilded glass and dates back to the fourth century, featuring Jesus with the world balanced in his hand and a scroll at his feet.

Inscriptions
Although thousands of inscriptions were lost as time passed, many of those remaining indicate the social rank or job title of its inhabitants; however, most of the inscriptions simply indicate how loving a couple was, or the love of parents and such. A common and particularly interesting one found in Roman catacombs is the Ichthys, or "Monogram of Christ" which reads ΙΧΘΥΣ, standing for "Jesus Christ, Son of God, Savior".

Bacteria
In recent years unique strains of bacteria have been discovered that thrive in catacombs, inducing mineral efflorescence and decay. These include Kribbella sancticallisti, Kribbella catacumbae, and three types of non-thermophilic (low-temperature) Rubrobacter.

See also
Cemetery
Crypt
 Ossuary
"The Cask of Amontillado"
Underground city
Necropolis

Notes

References
 Blyton, Enid "Five go to Smuggler's Top" Hodder and Stroughton (1945)  
 Éamonn Ó Carragáin, Carol L. Neuman de Vegvar Roma felix: formation and reflections of medieval Rome Ashgate (14 March 2008)  p. 33 Roma Felix: Formation and Reflections of Medieval Rome
 Nicholson, Paul Thomas (2005) "The sacred animal necropolis at North Saqqara: the cults and their catacombs" In Salima Ikram (ed) Divine creatures: animal mummies in Ancient Egypt. American University in Cairo Press, 2005 pp. 44–71.

External links

The Catacombs of Saint Sebastian
The Catacombs of Naples
The Catacombs of Odessa
The Catacombs of Paris
Catacombs
The Catacombs of Saint Callist
Subterranean Britannica
The Catacombs of Lima, Peru

 
Cemeteries
Subterranean buildings and structures